Get Your Wings is the second studio album by American rock band Aerosmith, released on March 15, 1974. The album was their first to be produced by Jack Douglas, who also was responsible for the band's next three albums. Three singles were released from the album, but none reached the singles charts.
 
The album has been released in stereo and quadraphonic, and certified triple platinum by the RIAA.

Background
In 1973, Aerosmith released its debut album to little fanfare. As guitarist Joe Perry recalled in the 1997 band memoir Walk This Way, "There was no nothing at all: no press, no radio, no airplay, no reviews, no interviews, no party. Instead the album got ignored and there was a lot of anger and flipping out." The band had been somewhat nervous recording their first album, with vocalist Steven Tyler going so far to alter his singing voice, and they had very little chemistry with producer Adrian Barber. The band moved into an apartment in Brookline and began intensive rehearsals in a dungeon-like basement of a store called Drummer's Image on Newbury Street. By the time they began recording Get Your Wings, however, Jack Douglas had agreed to work with the band, beginning a long and successful studio collaboration. According to Perry, Columbia had wanted the band to work with Bob Ezrin, who was also a producer with Alice Cooper. It was Ezrin who introduced the band to Douglas, and for "all practical purposes, Jack became our producer. Ezrin might have shown up three or four times, but only to make suggestions, like bringing in additional musicians to augment our sound."

Recording and composition
Get Your Wings was recorded at the Record Plant in New York City between December 1973 and January 1974. Jay Messina engineered the sessions. Douglas later recalled, "To the best of my memory, the preproduction work for Get Your Wings started in the back of a restaurant that was like a Mob hangout in the North End. I commuted there from the Copley Plaza Hotel and they started to play me the songs they had for their new album. My attitude was: 'What can I do to make them sound like themselves?'"

In 1997, Perry explained to Aerosmith biographer Stephen Davis:

In his autobiography, Tyler writes that some songs like "Seasons of Wither" had been "germinating in my head for a long time, but the other more sinister tracks, like 'Lord of the Thighs', came from the seedy area where we recorded the album. 'Lord of the Thighs' was about a pimp and the wildlife out on the street." Tyler plays the piano on the track, the opening beat of which is similar to the one Kramer would play a year later in "Walk This Way". He stated that the title was a pun on the famous William Golding novel Lord of the Flies, and "the critics hated us for this. We weren't supposed to be smart enough to use literary references."

One of the most well-known tracks is a cover of "Train Kept A-Rollin'", made popular by one of Aerosmith's favorite bands, the Yardbirds. According to Douglas, the crowd noise at the end of the track was taken from a "wild track" from The Concert for Bangladesh, which he had worked on. The single version omits the echo and crowd noise. Notable for its start/stop groove, the song became a core part of the band's live set for a time, and still occasionally ended concerts late in their career. In 1997, drummer Joey Kramer explained to Alan Di Perna of Guitar World that its unique rhythmic feel originated "probably just from jamming on it at soundcheck and experimenting with putting a James Brown kind of beat behind it. I played with a lot of R&B-type groups before joining Aerosmith." In the same interview, Perry stated that "Train" was the one song "we all had in common when we came together."

The closing "Pandora's Box" was originally written by Kramer, who recalled in 1997: "The summer before, we'd rented a farmhouse in East Thetford, Vermont, while we were rehearsing in New Hampshire, and that's where I wrote the melody of 'Pandora's Box.' Steven wrote the lines about women's liberation, a big new issue in those times." According to Douglas, the clarinet at the start of the track is a union engineer playing "I'm in the Mood for Love".

In 2014 Perry reflected, "We all put in endless hours, fueled by whatever substances were available... I knew the album, in spite of a few bright spots, still didn't capture the power of the band. We were better than the record we were making. And yet I didn't know how to get there. I didn't know how to get from good to great."

"On the second album," Tyler noted, "the songs found my voice. I realized that it's not about having a beautiful voice and hitting all the notes; it's about attitude."

Critical reception

Contemporary reviews were mostly positive. In his article for Rolling Stone, Charley Walters praised the LP, writing that "the snarling chords of guitarists Joe Perry and Brad Whitford tautly propel each number, jibing neatly with the rawness of singer Steven Tyler, whose discipline is evident no matter how he shrieks, growls, or spits out the lyrics." Billboard reviewer called the music "derivative", but added that the band's "tough and nasty rock'n'roll vision" could be successful with the help of the right producers. Music critic Robert Christgau wrote that the band were "inheritors of the Grand Funk principle: if a band is going to be dumb, it might as well be American dumb. Here they're loud and cunning enough to provide a real treat for the hearing-impaired, at least on side one."

In a retrospective review for AllMusic, Stephen Thomas Erlewine declared that Get Your Wings was when Aerosmith "shed much of their influences and developed their own trademark sound, it's where they turned into songwriters, it's where Steven Tyler unveiled his signature obsessions with sex and sleaze... they're doing their bloozy bluster better and bolder, which is what turns this sophomore effort into their first classic." Ben Mitchell of Blender had the same impression and wrote that Aerosmith locked into their "trademark dirty funk" and "firmly established their simple lyrical blueprint: smut and high times" on this album. Canadian critic Martin Popoff praised the album and called it a "rich, inspired and consistently entertaining rock 'n' roller, a record much more intelligent than much metal to this point in time".

Track listing

Personnel

Aerosmith
Steven Tylerlead vocals, acoustic guitar, piano, harmonica, percussion
Joe Perryrhythm guitar, 12-string guitar, acoustic guitar, slide guitar, backing vocals, lead guitars on "Woman of the World" and "Pandora's Box"
Brad Whitfordrhythm guitar, lead guitar on "Lord of the Thighs", "Spaced", "S.O.S. (Too Bad)", and "Seasons of Wither"
Tom Hamiltonbass guitar
Joey Kramerdrums, percussion, backing vocals

Additional musicians
Steve Hunterlead guitar on "Train Kept a Rollin'" (first half)
Dick Wagnerlead guitar on "Train Kept a Rollin'" (second half) and "Same Old Song and Dance"
Michael Breckertenor saxophone on "Same Old Song and Dance" and "Pandora's Box"
Randy Breckertrumpet on "Same Old Song and Dance"
Stan Bronsteinbaritone saxophone on "Same Old Song and Dance" and "Pandora's Box"
Jon Pearsontrombone on "Same Old Song and Dance"
Ray Colcordkeyboards on "Spaced"

Production
Jack Douglasproducer, engineer, Quadraphonic remix supervision
Ray Colcordproducer
Bob Ezrinexecutive producer
Jay Messina, Rod O'Brienengineers
David Krebs, Frank Connelly, Steve Leberdirection and management

Remastering personnel
Don DeVitoremastering producer
Vic Anesiniremastering engineer
Lisa Sparagano, Ken Fredettepackage design
Jimmy Ienner, Jr.Still Life photography
Leslie LambertStill Life collage design
Joel Zimmermanart supervision
Jay MessinaQuadraphonic remix engineer

Charts

Certification

References

Bibliography

Aerosmith albums
1974 albums
Albums produced by Jack Douglas (record producer)
Albums recorded at Record Plant (New York City)
Columbia Records albums

hu:Get Your Wings Tour